Nagore is a town in the Nagapattinam District, Tamil Nadu, India. It is located approximately 12 km North of Karaikal and 5 km South of Nagapattinam. Nearby towns are Karaikal, Tiruvarur, and Velankanni. It has a population of approximately 39,000. The prime attraction of the town is the Nagore Dargah Shareef. A sixteenth-century Islamic shrine, Nagore Dargah attracts millions of pilgrims irrespective of caste, creed or religion.

Specialty 
Nagore is the border line town between Tamilnadu and Puducherry. Beach is very neat and calm which is tail end of river Cauvery. District collector offices is just 3 km away from this town.

Unique foods 

 "Dumroot" [Sweet] which is one variety of halwa made by wheat
 "Kolameen" [Fish] which is available seasonally
 "Vaada" [Snacks] unique snacks item like vadai

Transport

By Air
Chennai International Airport 290 km
Tiruchirappalli International Airport 147 km

By Rail
Nagore station in 1 km from Nagore Dargah
Nagapattinam junction in 7 km
Karaikal station in 12 km
Thiruvarur junction in 26 km
Tanjore junction in 96 km
Thiruchirapalli junction in 145 km

Cities and towns in Nagapattinam district